Ethan Cohn (born April 18, 1979) is an American actor.

Career
Cohn starred in the films Cry Wolf, Rubber, The Experiment, and Lady in the Water.

He portrays Owen Kellogg in Atlas Shrugged (2011), the film adaptation of Ayn Rand's novel of the same name.

Most recently, he played a cranky birdwatcher A Birder's Guide to Everything, which has been picked up by Focus World.

He is best known for his role as Zane Taylor in science fiction serial drama television series Heroes. Cohn has worked in many television series, having small roles in CSI: Miami, Head Cases and Huff . However, he advanced rapidly in his career and had a recurrent role in Gilmore Girls as Glenn.

Along with playwright and journalist Elizabeth Savage, Cohn has written comedy television pilots and feature films.

Filmography

Film

Television

External links

References 

1979 births
American male film actors
American male television actors
Male actors from New York City
Living people